John J. Bonacic (born June 14, 1942 in New York City) is a retired politician from New York. A Republican, Bonacic represented New York State Senate District 42 (which includes all or parts of Delaware, Sullivan, Orange, and Ulster Counties) from November 1998 to 2018. Prior to his Senate service, Bonacic served in the New York State Assembly.

Personal life and education
Bonacic's grandparents were immigrants from Croatia. He received his Bachelor of Arts from Iona College in 1964, majoring in Economics. He received his JD at Fordham University School of Law in 1968.

Political career
On February 20, 1990, Bonacic was elected to the New York State Assembly, to fill the vacancy caused by the election of Mary M. McPhillips as Orange County Executive. Bonacic was re-elected four times and remained in the Assembly until 1998, sitting in the 188th, 189th, 190th, 191st and 192nd New York State Legislatures. In November 1998, he was elected to the New York State Senate.

Bonacic, a Republican, was the Chair of the Senate Racing, Gaming, and Wagering Committee. He sponsored a bill that would legalize online poker. He supported the opening of a casino in Sullivan County, New York.

While Bonacic cast a procedural vote against a 2013 bill that would have expanded abortion rights, he expressed support for the Reproductive Health Act in 2016. At a January 25, 2016 gathering of abortion advocates in Albany, the Senator commented, "'Both my daughter and my bride of 50 years believe in pro-choice and we should never deprive women of access of health care that they choose and their medical providers say is best for them.'" In 2015, Bonacic introduced a bill to legalize physician-assisted suicide.

In 2011, Bonacic voted against allowing same-sex marriage in New York in a roll-call vote on the Marriage Equality Act, which passed in a close 33-29 vote.

On May 6, 2018, Bonacic announced that he would not seek re-election in November 2018.

See also

List of Croatian Americans
List of Fordham University School of Law alumni
List of Iona College alumni

References

1942 births
Living people
Fordham University School of Law alumni
Iona University alumni
Republican Party members of the New York State Assembly
Republican Party New York (state) state senators
People from Mount Hope, New York
County legislators in New York (state)
American people of Croatian descent
21st-century American politicians